Lenon Fernandes Ribeiro, or simply Lenon (born May 2, 1990 in São Paulo), is a Brazilian defensive midfielder, who also plays as a right back. He currently plays for Cuiabá.

Career

Flamengo
Lenon was promoted to Flamengo's professional squad in 2009 during the Rio de Janeiro State League and debuted in a Fla-Flu derby on April 5. With coach Andrade he received more chances to play with 10 appearances in 2009 Brazilian Série A and one in the Copa do Brasil.

Career statistics
(Correct )

according to combined sources on the Flamengo official website and Flaestatística.Lenon stats at Flestatística

Honours

Youth
 Flamengo
Rio State League: 2006
Torneio Internacional Circuito das Águas: 2007
Copa Macaé de Juvenis: 2007

Professional
 Flamengo
Taça Rio: 2009
Rio State League: 2009
Brazilian Série A: 2009

References

External links
 Player Profile @ Flapedia
 footballzz.co.uk

1989 births
Living people
Brazilian footballers
CR Flamengo footballers
Goiás Esporte Clube players
Duque de Caxias Futebol Clube players
Clube Náutico Capibaribe players
Sport Club do Recife players
Association football midfielders
Footballers from São Paulo